Mount Sapo is a fictional mountain supposed to exist somewhere near Rome, presumably in Italy.  It appears in a fanciful rewriting of the history of soap, and it is often claimed to explain the origins of the name.  The tale occurs in a number of online sources, including the website of The Soap and Detergent Association.

The story about Mount Sapo explains that upon its slopes, ancient Romans used to sacrifice animals as burnt offerings.  Wood ash from the fires of their altars mingled with the grease from the animal sacrifices, forming a primitive kind of soap.  This soap found its way to the clays of a nearby stream, where local people found that it helped them get their laundry cleaner.  Soap gets its Latin name, sapo, from the name of the mountain.

This narrative is probably a hoax.  There are many reasons to find it improbable:  
No record of any place with this name appears in the history of Rome, nor in the current Italian geographical names.
Some versions of the story credit Mount Sapo to an "ancient Roman legend," but this legend does not appear in classical mythology.  
The word sapo is known only in Late Latin, and makes its first appearance in the Natural History of Pliny the Elder.  In book 28, chapter 51, Pliny writes:
Prodest et sapo, Galliarum hoc inventum rutilandis capillis. Fit ex sebo et cinere, optimus fagino et caprino, duobus modis, spissus ac liquidus, uterque apud Germanos maiore in usu viris quam feminis.
There is also soap (sapo), an invention of the Gauls for making their hair shiny. It is made from tallow and ashes, the best from beechwood ash and goat fat, and exists in two forms, solid and liquid; among the Germans both are used more by men than by women.
This narrative suggests that Pliny the Elder was unaware of soap's detergent properties, and that his readers might be unfamiliar with the name of the commodity, and its uses.  Soap was not used in Roman baths; soapy water would make the public bathing areas lathery.  
The etymology of soap is fairly straightforward; it comes either from a Gaulish word *sapo- or a Germanic word *saipa-.  Both of these words are cognate with Latin sebum, meaning "fat" or "tallow."  
Ancient Greeks and Romans did not burn the edible flesh of animals in burnt sacrifices; they instead took the edible parts, including meat and fat, for themselves, and left only the inedible bones and entrails for the gods.  What was burnt at a Roman sacrifice would have made but a small amount of soap.

See also
False etymology

References
Adkins, L, ed., Dictionary of Roman Religion (Oxford, 2001) 
Tucker, T. G., Etymological Dictionary of Latin (Ares, 1976, reprinted) 
Buck, C. D., A Dictionary of Selected Synonyms in the Principal Indo-European Languages (Univ. Chicago, 1988, reprint)

External links
Garzena, Patrizia, A history of soap
Mount Sapo in the rogueclassicism blog.

Hoaxes in Italy
Sapo
Sapo